Alexander Nicholas Ernst Stieda (born April 13, 1961) is a former professional road bicycle racer from Canada.  Stieda led five classifications of the Tour de France on the second day of the 1986 Tour de France: the general classification, the mountains classification, the combination classification, the intermediate sprints classification and the young rider classification, becoming the first North American to lead the Tour de France. He finished in 120th place, in his only Tour de France, riding on the 7-Eleven - Hoonved Cycling Team. He also placed bronze in the 1982 Australian Commonwealth Games, and competed at the 1984 Summer Olympics for his native country. At the 1983 Summer Universiade he won the bronze medal in the men's individual pursuit. He also competed in the individual pursuit and points race events at the 1984 Summer Olympics. Alex is the co-founder of the Tour of Alberta professional cycling race.

Palmarès 

1986
Tour de France:
First North American to wear the yellow jersey
1989
Canadian Tire Series

References

External links
http://www.stiedacycling.com/

 
 

1961 births
Living people
Sportspeople from Vancouver
Canadian male cyclists
Sportspeople from Ontario
Olympic cyclists of Canada
Cyclists at the 1984 Summer Olympics
Commonwealth Games bronze medallists for Canada
Cyclists at the 1982 Commonwealth Games
Commonwealth Games medallists in cycling
Universiade medalists in cycling
Universiade bronze medalists for Canada
Medalists at the 1983 Summer Universiade
Medallists at the 1982 Commonwealth Games